Andrew Alexander Simone,  (born May 12, 1938) is a Canadian physician, dermatologist and founder of Canadian Food for Children, a charity which collects funds and food for starving children around the world. He operates an Etobicoke (Toronto) based practice as one of the few walk-in dermatology clinics in the region.

Early life and education 
Born and raised in Toronto, he is the son of a Sicilian immigrant father and a French-Canadian mother. He graduated as Doctor of Medicine in 1963 from Queen's University and became a dermatologist in 1968 after specializing at Harvard Medical School.

Personal life
He is married to Joan Simone née Hoare, an English-Canadian, with whom he has 13 children.

In 1985, after meeting Mother Teresa, he founded Canadian Food for Children.

A fitness enthusiast, Simone has completed four Ironman Triathlons and the Boston Marathon twice.

Achievements and honors
 1987: Papal cross, Pro Ecclesia et Pontifice, St. Michael's Cathedral Basilica (Toronto)

 1997: Doctor of Sacred Letters, Honoris Causa, University of St. Michael's College

 1998: Christian Stewardship Award, International Catholic Stewardship Council

 2000: Order of Canada

 2002: Order of Merit, Religious and Military Order of the Knightly Order of St. Catherine with Mount Sinai

 2006: St. Anthony's International Award for Solidarity With the Poor

 2019: Humanitarian Dermatology Certificate of Appreciation, International League of Dermatological Societies

 2020: Teasdale-Corti Award, Royal College of Physicians and Surgeons of Canada

References

1938 births
Living people
Canadian dermatologists
Canadian people of Sicilian descent
Harvard Medical School alumni
Queen's University at Kingston alumni
Members of the Order of Canada
People from Etobicoke